Light & Heavy may refer to:

Light & Heavy (film), 1991 short film
Light & Heavy: The Best of Iron Butterfly, 1993 album by Iron Butterfly